The Fifth Yoshida Cabinet was the 51st Cabinet of Japan. It was headed by Shigeru Yoshida from May 21, 1953, to December 10, 1954.

Cabinet

References 

Cabinet of Japan
1953 establishments in Japan
Cabinets established in 1953
Cabinets disestablished in 1954
1954 disestablishments in Japan